Barker Dam may refer to:
 Barker Dam (California), listed on the U.S. National Register of Historic Places
 Barker Dam at Barker Meadow Reservoir, Colorado